Abumuslim Magomedovich Bogatyryov (born 28 August 1984) is a Russian former professional football player.

Club career
Bogatyryov played in the Kazakhstan Premier League with FC Kaisar.

External links
 Career summary by sportbox.ru
 

1984 births
People from Kaspiysk
Living people
Russian footballers
Association football midfielders
FC Sakhalin Yuzhno-Sakhalinsk players
FC SKA Rostov-on-Don players
FC Zhemchuzhina Sochi players
FC Avangard Kursk players
FC Baikal Irkutsk players
Kazakhstan Premier League players
Russian expatriate footballers
Expatriate footballers in Kazakhstan
Expatriate footballers in Uzbekistan
Sportspeople from Dagestan